Government Medical College and Hospital, Nagpur is a medical college located in Ajni which is part of South Nagpur, Maharashtra, India. It was founded in 1947 and was affiliated with Nagpur University from 1947 to 1997, and subsequently Maharashtra University of Health Sciences (MUHS).

Location
The college is located in south Nagpur, the winter capital of the state of Maharashtra. The campus is stretched over an area of 196 acres. Government Medical College(GMC), Nagpur is also known to have the largest campus among all government medical colleges in Asia.

Academics

Government Medical College(GMC), Nagpur has various academic departments, with specialized laboratories and research centers.

Departments

 Anatomy
 Anesthesiology
 Biochemistry
 Dermatology-Venereology-Leprology
 Otorhinolaryngology (ENT)
 Forensic Pathology
 Medicine
 Microbiology
 Obstetrics and Gynaecology
 Occupational Therapy
 Ophthalmology
 Orthopedics
 Pathology
 Pediatrics
 Pharmacology
 Physiology
 Physiotherapy
 Plastic-Maxillofacial-Reconstructive surgery
 Pulmonology
 Preventive Medicine and Social Medicine
 Surgery
 Radiation Therapy and Oncology
 Radio Diagnosis
 Radiology

Recognition

The college is recognized by the Medical Council of India (MCI), New Delhi.

Notable alumni

 Shrikant Jichkar, former member of the Indian National Congress
 Ibrahim Ismail of Johor, 25th Sultan of Johor and the 5th Sultan of modern Johor. 
 Prakash Amte, social activist, Magsaysay awardee, director of Lok Biradari Prakalp.
 Mandakini Amte, social activist, Magsaysay awardee.
 Zulekha Daud, a renowned physician-turned-entrepreneur and Pravasi Bharatiya Samman awardee.
 Sheetal Amte, Indian public health expert, disability specialist and social entrepreneur.
 V. Maitreyan, an Indian oncologist and politician from Tamil Nadu.
 Ranjit Patil, orthopedic surgeon and politician from Maharashtra.
 Abhay and Rani Bang, social activist and researcher working in the field of community health.
 Abhay and Rani Bang, social activist and researcher working in the field of community health.
 Sunil Deshmukh, former radiologist and politician from Maharashtra.
 Harminder Dua, ophthalmologist discovered the 6th layer of cornea the DUA's layer.
 Vikas Mahatme, famous ophthalmologist, Padma Shri awardee and politician from Maharashtra.

References

External links 
 Official website

Universities and colleges in Nagpur
Science and technology in Nagpur
Medical colleges in Maharashtra
Educational institutions established in 1947
1947 establishments in India
Affiliates of Maharashtra University of Health Sciences